Tiant is a surname. Notable people with the surname include:

Luis Tiant (born 1940), Cuban baseball player
Luis Tiant Sr. (1906–1976), Cuban baseball player

See also
Tant